Skive Folkeblad is a Danish-language daily local newspaper based in Skive, Denmark. It has been in circulation since 1880.

History and profile
Skive Folkeblad was launched in 1880. The paper is headquartered in Skive and serves the Skive Municipality, parts of the Viborg Municipality and parts of the Holstebro Municipality. During the 1950s under the Cold War conditions Skive Folkeblad was one of the publications which expressed negative neutralism which was similar to German nihilism.

Skive Folkeblad was an independent newspaper until September 2020 when the Mediehuset Herning Folkeblad acquired the paper which also owns other local newspapers, including Herning Folkeblad and Midtjyllands Avis. Ole Dall is the editor-in-chief of Skive Folkeblad. 

In February 2021 Skive Folkeblad was redesigned, and its content was expanded. The paper also began to publish weekly supplements.

References

External links

1880 establishments in Denmark
Daily newspapers published in Denmark
Danish-language newspapers
Newspapers established in 1880